Legio XVI Flavia firma ("Steadfast Flavian Sixteenth Legion") was a legion of the Imperial Roman army. The legion was created by Emperor Vespasian in 70 from the remains of the XVI Gallica (which had surrendered in the Batavian rebellion). The unit still existed in the 4th century, when it guarded the Euphrates border and camped in Sura (Syria). The emblem of the legion was a Pegasus, although earlier studies assumed it to have been a lion.


Attested members

See also 
 List of Roman legions

References

External links 
 livius.org account

16 Flavia Firma
Military units and formations established in the 1st century
Roman Syria
70s establishments in the Roman Empire
70s establishments
Vespasian
70 establishments